"The Tip of My Fingers", also titled "The Tips of My Fingers", is a song written and originally recorded by American country music singer Bill Anderson. First included on his 1962 album Bill Anderson Sings Country Heart Songs, the song was a Top Ten country single for him in 1960.

Chart performance

Roy Clark version

In 1963, Roy Clark released a version from his album Roy Clark Sings The Tip of My Fingers, titled "The Tips of My Fingers". It was his first chart single, reaching number 10 on the country charts and number 45 on the pop charts.

Chart performance

Eddy Arnold version

Eddy Arnold recorded the song in 1966 on his album Somebody Like Me. It was the first single from that album, reaching number 3 on the country charts.

Chart performance

Jean Shepard version

In 1975, Jean Shepard released a rendition of the song as well. Her version was included on Poor Sweet Baby (And Ten Other Bill Anderson Songs), an album comprising cover versions of Anderson's work.

Chart performance

Anita Perras version

Canadian country music singer Anita Perras covered the song on her 1989 album Touch My Heart. Her version was released as a single and peaked at number 9 on the RPM Country Tracks chart.

Chart performance

Year-end charts

Steve Wariner version

The most recently charted cover version was by Steve Wariner, on his 1991 album I Am Ready. It was his twenty-fourth Top Ten country hit, also peaking at number 3. Wariner's rendition was also titled "The Tips of My Fingers". Wariner's version features backing vocals from Vince Gill.

Chart performance

Year-end charts

Other recorded versions
It was recorded by UK singer Karl Denver in 1966, however it did not chart. 
 Dean Martin recorded the song in 1970 for his album My Woman My Woman My Wife
UK singer Des O'Connor recorded it in 1970 where it reached number 15 in the UK singles chart.

References

1960 singles
1963 singles
1966 singles
1975 singles
1989 singles
1992 singles
Bill Anderson (singer) songs
Eddy Arnold songs
Roy Clark songs
Jean Shepard songs
Anita Perras songs
Steve Wariner songs
Songs written by Bill Anderson (singer)
Music videos directed by Deaton-Flanigen Productions
Song recordings produced by Chet Atkins
Song recordings produced by Larry Butler (producer)
Song recordings produced by Scott Hendricks
Decca Records singles
Capitol Records singles
RCA Records singles
United Artists Records singles
Arista Nashville singles
1960 songs